Neumeren u svemu is the ninth studio album by Serbian rock band Van Gogh, released in 2013.

Background 
The band's frontman Zvonimir Đukić and drummer Srboljub Radivojević, the only two mainstay members of the band since its formation, were credited on the album as the only two members of Van Gogh. It is the band's second album to feature Đukić and Radivojević as the only two official members (the other one being their fifth studio album Opasan ples). The album was released on compact disc and on vinyl record.

Track listing
  „Osećam da ludim“ (Z. Đukić, S. Radivojević) – 4:06
  „Uvek ima neka razlika“ (Z. Đukić) – 3:06
  „Prva i poslednja kap“ (Z. Đukić, S. Radivojević) – 3:59
  „Neumeren u svemu“ (Z. Đukić, S. Radivojević) – 3:19
  „Nešto vuče me dole“ (Z. Đukić) – 3:54
  „Viline vode“ (Z. Đukić) – 4:22
  „Moj nemir i ja“ (Z. Đukić) – 3:25
  „Skačem – skači“ (Z. Đukić) – 3:31
  „Previše za jednog, premalo za dvoje“ (Z. Đukić, S. Radivojević, O. Mrđenović) – 3:57
  „Anđele, moj brate“ (Z. Đukić, A. Gligorijević) – 4:46

Personnel
Zvonimir Đukić - vocals, guitar, bass guitar, keyboards, mandolin, programming, arranged by
Srboljub Radivojević - drums, percussion, backing vocals, arranged by

Additional personnel
Vojislav Aralica - programming, guitar, keyboards, bass guitar, backing vocals, produced by, arranged by
Sonja Kalajić - musical saw, violin, castanets (track 6)
Nikola Usanović - bass guitar (tracks: 3, 4)
Bojana Rašić - backing vocals (track 10)
Nevena Filipović - backing vocals (track 10)
Nikola "Kolja" Pejaković - backing vocals (track 10)
Choir (track 10)
Anđela Dinić
Aleksa Dinić
Teodora Butulija
Teodora Timotić
Hristina Timotijević
Nina Ranđeović
Anđela Platiša

References

Neumeren u svemu at Discogs

External links
Neumeren u svemu at Discogs

Van Gogh (band) albums
2013 albums